KF Divjaka is an Albanian professional football club based in Divjakë. They are currently competing in the Albanian Third Division.

See also
List of football clubs in Albania

References

Divjaka
1960 establishments in Albania
Association football clubs established in 1960
Divjakë
Kategoria e Dytë clubs
Albanian Third Division clubs